Lianyungang is a prefecture-level city in northeastern Jiangsu province, China. It borders Yancheng to its southeast, Huai'an and Suqian to its south, Xuzhou to its southwest, and the province of Shandong to its north. Its name derives from Lian Island, the largest island in Jiangsu which lies off its coastline, and Yuntai Mountain, the highest peak in Jiangsu, a few miles from the city center, and the fact that it is a port. The name can be literally translated as the Port Connecting the Clouds.

Lianyungang was home to 4,599,360 inhabitants as of the 2020 census whom 1,210,767 lived in the built-up (or metro) area made of Haizhou and Lianyun counties. Lianyungang was known in the West as Haichow (Postal romanization), which means the City of Sea. Haichow was opened to foreign trade by the Qing imperial government in 1905.

Geography
Lianyungang is between 118°24' and 119°48' east longitude and 34°11' and 35°07' north latitude.

Administration

The prefecture-level city of Lianyungang administers six county-level divisions, including three districts and three counties.

Economy

Lianyungang is one of the first 14 Chinese coastal cities opening to the outside world and a rising center of industry, foreign trade, and tourism in east China. It is the eastern terminus of the New Eurasian Land Bridge and the proposed Northern East West Freight Corridor. The New Eurasia Continental Landbridge continue by land, connecting Lianyungang with over 40 countries and regions in Europe, South Asia and the Middle East by railway networks.

The Lianyun-Port, in the center of the coast, links eastern sea routes with western land routes. Japan and South Korea in the east can be reached economically and conveniently from Lianyungang. Near the port, the Tianwan Nuclear Power Plant is one of the biggest nuclear power plants in China, with two operational units and six more planned. Lianyungang is also rich in mineral resources. Donghai County has 70% of the national reserve of natural crystal, and is manufacturing 80% of China’s crystal products.

The Chinese government has stated its intention to build an economic belt along the New Eurasia Continental Landbridge in "the Ninth Five-Year Plan of the National Economy and Social Development and the Long-range Goal for the Year 2010." On "China's 21st Century Agenda", Lianyungang is to be developed into an international seaport linking countries on the Pacific rim with those in Central Asia. In the "National Ocean Development Plan" it is listed as one of three special development zones.

Lianyungang Economic & Technological Development Zone was approved by the State Council as one of the first batch of state-level development zones in December 1984. It is in the eastern new seashore urban area of Liangyungang City.

On July 18, 2019, began a construction on a large petrochemical storage dock in the Xuwei area of the port of Lianyungang.

Climate 

The temperature in Lianyungang can reach average highs of 30 °C in the summer and drop to as low as −4 °C in the winter. Lianyungang’s climate is classified by Köppen and Geiger as Cwa (humid subtropical climate with dry winters).

The vast majority of precipitation occurs between June and August, where it can measure up to 278mm of rainfall on average. Winter precipitation is quite low, making snowfall rare and short-lived.

Tourism

Lian Island Resort 

One of the most popular tourist attractions in Lianyungang and the only AAAA-Class beachfront in Jiangsu Province, Lian Island is a beautiful island connected to Lianyun District by a  sea dyke, the longest in China. There are two main beach and swimming areas, several places to eat, as well as hotels. Lian Island is home to an annual music extravaganza featuring some of China's most famous pop stars.

Huaguo Mountain 

Lianyungang is famous for its "Huaguo Shan, Shuilian Dong" attraction. Shuiliandong literally means the "Water Curtain Hole," since, according to legend, the hole was hidden behind a waterfall, therefore resembling a "curtain of water."

The hole is famous because according to legend it is the home of Sun Wukong, commonly known as the Monkey King from the epic novel Journey to the West. In this hole, underneath the mountain is where he and his monkey subjects lived. After learning Tao, the Monkey King traveled back to the hole so that he and his subjects could eat and play for eternity. Eventually, the Jade Emperor sent heavenly armies to battle him at this spot because of his misdeeds. While the Monkey King story is a work of fiction, Xuanzang, the monk who he accompanies on the journey of the novel, was based on a historical person.

Transport

Lianyungang has convenient transport including highway, railway, port and airport. It is one of the 42 major transportation hub cities in China.

Airport

Railway

Lianyungang is the eastern end of the Longhai Railway (formerly the Lunghai Railway), connecting it with Lanzhou in central China. As a major arterial east–west railway in China, it runs from Lianyungang to Lanzhou, Gansu through the provinces of Jiangsu, Anhui, Henan, Shaanxi, and Gansu, covering a total length of 1,759 km.

Lianyungang-Xuzhou Highspeed Railway, connecting Lianyungang and the important provincial transportation hub of Xuzhou, is under construction.

Qingdao-Yancheng Highspeed Railway, part of China's Coastal High-speed Railway, goes through Lianyungang. The length of this railway is 429 km and the speed standard is 200 km/h.

Lianyungang-Nanjing/Zhenjiang Highspeed Railway connects Lianyungang and the provincial capital, Nanjing.

Expressway
Lianyungang is the intersection of G15 Shenyang–Haikou Expressway, G25 Changchun–Shenzhen Expressway and G30 Lianyungang–Khorgas Expressway.

Port
Lianyungang port is among the 10 largest ports in China and the 30 largest port in the world. The cargo throughput of Lianyungang port is 210 million ton/year (2015). The container throughput is 5 million TEU/year (2015). The port is part of the Maritime Silk Road that runs from the Chinese coast to the south via Singapore towards the southern tip of India, to Mombasa, then through the Suez Canal to the Mediterranean with its connections to Central and Eastern Europe.

Notable people
 

Chen Qinggang (born 1966), journalist and newspaper bureau chief
Zhong Huijuan (born 1961), pharmaceutical entrepreneur

See also

 List of twin towns and sister cities in China

References

External links
Government website of Lianyungang  
Lianyungang comprehensive guide with open directory (Jiangsu.NET)
Tang Seng

 
Cities in Jiangsu
Prefecture-level divisions of Jiangsu
Port cities and towns in China